Sluger (plural slugeri; , ; sometimes also sulger ) was a historical rank traditionally held by boyars in Moldavia and Wallachia, roughly corresponding to a sort of Intendant or Master of the Larder. It originated in the Slavic služar. 

Slugeri were in charge of supplying the courts of Moldavian or Wallachian Princes with meat mainly beef. They were also in charge of distributing meat to the court households.

References

Romanian noble titles
Romanian words and phrases